The Healesville railway line, in Melbourne, Australia, was the non-electrified continuation of the suburban Lilydale line, extending into the Yarra Valley. The line closed in the 1980s, but a heritage railway group, the Yarra Valley Railway, is working to retain part of the line between Yarra Glen and Healesville.

History
The Lilydale railway line was extended to Yarra Flats (now known as Yarra Glen) on 15 May 1888 with intermediate stations at Coldstream and Yering. Part of the structure included a long timber viaduct with 502 openings near Yarra Glen, spanning the Yarra River and the adjacent flood plains. The extension of the line from Yarra Glen to Healesville on 1 March 1889 required a 1 in 40 climb into a 154.4 metre tunnel with a corresponding descent at nearly the same grade.
Opened at the same time was the intermediate station of Tarrawarra.

Traffic on the line included timber, livestock, milk and dairy products. Early timetables included regular goods services specifically for transporting milk.

The last regular steam passenger service was hauled in August 1964. From that time until the closure of the line in 1980, passenger services were run using diesel-electric rail motors. As from 9 December 1980 all services were withdrawn, except for some goods services to Coldstream. The line was officially closed to all traffic on 10 March 1983.

Around 2003 the uncontrolled level crossings at Beresford Rd and the Macintyre Lane were effectively removed by simply rebuilding the roads at a slightly raised level, burying the tracks beneath the bitumen. This was advantageous for the bus company whose depot is situated near the Beresford Rd crossing as buses are required to come to a complete stop at uncontrolled level crossings even if the rail line is disused. Stopping is no longer necessary now that the crossing has been removed.

On 7 February 2009 most of the trestle bridges which were a major part of the viaduct crossing the Yarra river and its floodplains were destroyed in the Black Saturday bushfires.

Services
The Healesville line had both passenger and freight services. The passenger services generally ran as a shuttle between Lilydale and Healesville stations. The freight services transported local timber, live-stock, and dairy products. Early trains running on the line included a daily evening "mixed milk and passenger train" and a single milk train on Sundays.

Prior to electrification reaching Lilydale in November 1925, the line was operated by 'A2' locomotives. After this time passenger trains on the Healesville and Warburton lines were run by two electric motor carriages from Melbourne to Lilydale, at which place 'K' or 'D3' steam locos took the carriages onto Healesville and Warburton.

On 28 October 1957 the steam hauled 7-day-a-week service was replaced by a 153hp Walker railmotor operating four services a day each way and three on weekends. Prior to this, services were limited to three each way on weekdays and two each way on weekends. On 21 April 1958 the Victorian Education Department subsidised school trains using a Walker railcar.  This rail car service crossed with other services at Yarra Glen until 1972.

Trains operating on the line
Throughout the existence of the line many steam and diesel locomotives and railcars operated on the Healesville line.
R class steam locomotives (1889–)
D class steam locomotives (1908–)
By 1913 all classes of locomotives were permitted on the line, however by 1918 all classes but the C class were allowed.
A2 locomotives (ceased by 1925)
J, K and D3 steam locomotives (ceased regular service in 1964).
T and B class diesels (1952–1962).
Y class diesel (until the line's official closure)
Walker railmotor (1957–1978).
DERM 62 (1978–1979)
DERM 58 (1979–1980) 
Towards the closure of the line the DERM (Diesel Electric Rail Motor) was only permitted a maximum speed on 30 km/h and no locomotive-hauled passenger trains were permitted. Only "Y" class diesels could haul the freight services due to the deterioration of the track condition, which resulted in the derailment of T401 on 5 August 1980.

Current status

The Yarra Valley Railway currently run a Walker railmotor from Healesville to the Tarrawarra Winery, crossing the Watts River, under the Donovan's Road overbridge and through the tunnel.

There are plans in place to improve the line from Healesville to Tarrawarra to a standard suitable for the running of Rail Motors, with further goals being reconstruction to Yarra Glen. Works are underway to restore the track from Yarra Glen to Healesville following the loss of 13 bridges on Black Saturday 2009. It is hoped to have this complete by 2017, as much progress has been made by an enthusiastic volunteer group throughout 2015.

Railmotor operations have commenced with restored 153 hp walker railmotor RM22 receiving accreditation to run a passenger train on the line as of 5 March 2010. It ran its first paying passenger run since restored on 7 March with the seats being auctioned in singles, doubles and triples to the exhibitors of the model railway show.

The tourist railway is in possession of a number of locomotives, including two Victorian Railways J-class steam engines, a T-class diesel-electric locomotive, a W-class diesel-hydraulic locomotive, a Y-Class diesel, a 153 hp Walker Rail motor and a diesel electric rail motor (DERM).

Yarra Valley Trail
A rail trail is being progressively constructed as the Yarra Valley Trail along the whole disused alignment of the line, including the reconstruction of bridges. Between Yarra Glen to Healesville, the trail will run parallel to the track. Future connections were also proposed to link up Healesville to the Warburton rail trails and form a loop. Stage 1A of the rail trail opened between Lilydale and Yering in February 2020.

Line guide
Services to Healesville mostly departed from Lilydale.

See also
Yarra Valley Railway

References

Closed Melbourne railway lines
5 ft 3 in gauge railways in Australia
Railway lines opened in 1889
Railway lines closed in 1992
1889 establishments in Australia
1992 disestablishments in Australia